Carex graeffeana is a tussock-forming species of perennial sedge in the family Cyperaceae. It is native to parts of Malesia and islands of the south western Pacific Ocean.

The species was first formally described by the botanist Johann Otto Boeckeler in 1875 as a part of the work Flora. It has six synonyms;
Carex euphlebia S.T.Blake 
Carex exploratorum Nelmes 
Carex graeffeana var. samoensis Nelmes 
Carex pandanus Ohwi 
Carex philippinensis Nelmes 
Carex rechingeri Palla

See also
List of Carex species

References

graeffeana
Taxa named by Johann Otto Boeckeler
Plants described in 1875
Flora of Fiji
Flora of Java
Flora of Borneo
Flora of the Lesser Sunda Islands
Flora of New Guinea
Flora of Samoa
Flora of the Philippines
Flora of the Bismarck Archipelago